is a Japanese photographer. He is the grandson of painter Gyokudō Kawai. In 1958 he became Akira Satō's assistant and since 1959 he works as a freelance photographer.

References

Japanese photographers
1937 births
Living people
Place of birth missing (living people)